James Nixon (born 10 August 1985) is a former Scotland international rugby league footballer. He represented Scotland at international level on three occasions in 2009.

Background
He was born in Dalton-in-Furness, Cumbria, England, he is of Scottish descent.

Career
Nixon announced his retirement from the game before the beginning of the 2013 season, but returned later that year to play for amateur side Dalton. He re-signed for Barrow ahead of the 2014 season.

Career records
Nixon is seventh in Barrow's all time try scorers list with 137 tries.

References

External links
Barrow profile

1985 births
Living people
Barrow Raiders players
English people of Scottish descent
English rugby league players
Rugby league players from Barrow-in-Furness
Rugby league wingers
Scotland national rugby league team players